Garwolin  is a town on the Wilga river in eastern Poland, capital of Garwolin County, situated in the southeast part of the Garwolin plateau in Masovian Voivodeship, 62 km southeast of Warsaw, 100 km northwest of Lublin. As of December 2021, the town has 17,566 inhabitants.

History

The name of the town occurs in the medieval notes in 1386 and 1404. Name Garwolin comes from a Garwoł, which is a name. However, there is a popular legend connecting the town's name with rooks (Polish: gawrony).

Traces of settlement on terrains of present days boundaries of Garwolin are more than 2000 years old. It is believed that Garwolin received its city charter in 1423, but the exact date is unknown; it is almost certain that the document from 1423 was only acknowledgement of before-stated city laws. In time of the Deluge casualties exceeded 90%.

During the Polish–Soviet War, the town was captured and briefly occupied by the invading Russians, before it was recaptured by the Poles led by Gen. Konarzewski on August 16, 1920. Polish Marshal Józef Piłsudski stayed in the town the next day.

During World War II and the Nazi occupation of Poland, about 70% of the city was destroyed. The town and the powiat were administered by Kreishauptmann Karl Freudenthal, who was responsible for the murder of more than 1000 inhabitants, the deportation of several thousand local Poles to concentration camps and slave labor in Nazi Germany, and the transfer of the local Jews to various ghettos in the region. For his war crimes, Freudenthal was sentenced to death by the Polish underground, and the sentence was carried out by the Home Army on 5 July 1944, as part of Operacja Główki ("Operation Heads").

Two Poles from Garwolin were also murdered by the Russians in the large Katyn massacre in 1940, and six died in Soviet Gulag camps between 1939 and 1947.

At the end of July 1944 the Red Army's 2nd Guards Tank Army, under the command of Alexei Radzievsky, routed the German 73rd Infantry Division at Garwolin, capturing its commander, Friedrich Franek.

After the war Garwolin was restored to Poland and enlarged. From 1975 to 1998, it was administratively located in the Siedlce Voivodeship. The Neo-Baroque church, dating from the turn of the 19th and 20th centuries, is a notable building.

Education
 the Józef Piłsudski grammar school,
 two vocational schools,
 Academy of Management in Łódź, branch in Garwolin.

Economy
Centre of industry and services; machine, means of transport, nutritive (milk co-operative, meat) industries, clothing, leather, construction materials, furniture and cosmetics manufactures.

Transport

Roads
 S17 expressway: direction Warsaw-Garwolin-Lublin-Hrebenne,
 National road 76: direction Łuków-Garwolin-Wilga.

Rail
Garwolin railway station is located 5 km west from the center of town in the nearby village Wola Rębkowska, on rail route Warszawa-Lublin.

Culture and sports
 "Wilga" cinema 3D
 Centre of Sports and Culture
 "Garwolanka" swimming pool
 Wilga Garwolin sports Club.

References

External links

 County of Garwolin 
 City's Hall Official Page
 Garwolin County's Community Association
 Community of Garwolin
 Jewish Community in Garwolin on Virtual Shtetl

Cities and towns in Masovian Voivodeship
Garwolin County
Masovia
Masovian Voivodeship (1526–1795)
Siedlce Governorate
Lublin Governorate
Lublin Voivodeship (1919–1939)
Warsaw Voivodeship (1919–1939)
Holocaust locations in Poland